is a Japanese anime director from Osaka Prefecture. He is known for his incendiary behavior on Twitter and for being fired from Kyoto Animation and Ordet, the latter of which he helped co-found.

Biography

As a member of Kyoto Animation, Yamamoto rose to prominence within the company after serving as assistant director on Munto 2: Beyond the Walls of Time. In 2006, he was selected to be the series production director of The Melancholy of Haruhi Suzumiya, after which he became well known among anime fans for the ending dance theme he choreographed. He was to make his full directorial debut with Lucky Star, but was replaced after four episodes due to "performance issues". In a later radio interview, Yamamoto confirmed he was fired by Kyoto Animation and unsuccessfully attempted to win back his job. He later assumed the position of Ordet's president. In 2008, he directed Kannagi: Crazy Shrine Maidens with Ordet and A-1 Pictures.

In 2009, he directed a 90-second short film for inclusion in the fourth volume of the Tonari no 801-chan manga. The short was produced by A-1 Pictures and featured character designs by Satoshi Kadowaki. Production of the short came after the announcement that Kyoto Animation would be producing a Tonari no 801-chan television series. However, less than two weeks later, the series was canceled without explanation by its broadcaster, TBS. Yamamoto wrote that the short was a chance to "avenge myself" on his blog.

His next project was Black Rock Shooter, an OVA released in July 2010. Yamamoto was the supervising director for the project, Ordet's first solo production as the main animation studio, while Shinobu Yoshioka, another former Kyoto Animation member, directed it. Yamamoto attended the American anime convention Otakon in 2009. In early 2011, Yamamoto directed the anime Fractale with production by A-1 Pictures and Ordet. He directed three films and a television series for Wake Up, Girls!, but was removed as director for the sequel series. Yamamoto was fired by Ordet on March 25, 2016. On February 25, 2017, he announced his next work would be an original anime film titled Hakubo, to be financed via crowdfunding. Yamamoto served as writer and director on the film, which was released in 2019. On March 4, 2019, the Tokyo District Court commenced bankruptcy proceedings against Yamamoto. His lawyer stated that this would not affect his Hakubo film project.

Yamamoto has threatened to quit his career in anime production six times over the years. In May 2019, Yamamoto vowed never to "work on anything related to animation again" after finishing Hakubo. He has become notorious for his incendiary behavior on Twitter, including calling fans of anime "[mentally] disabled", discriminatory remarks about Chinese and Korean anime fans, and attacking his former cast members, which have resulted in him being temporarily suspended from Twitter in 2018.

In September 2019, Yamamoto announced that he will crowdfund a dark fantasy anime titled Magical Girls on Crowdfire, which is inspired by the Kyoto Animation arson attack. In March 2022, it was announced the project has been stalled due to the lack of investors.

Filmography

Credited as a director
 Lucky Star (2007, ep 1-4)
Kannagi (2008): Also Episode Director (ep 1, 13, OP, ED), Storyboard Artist (ep 1, 7, 13, OP, ED)
Watashi no Yasashiku nai Senpai (2010)
Fractale (2011): Also Episode Director (1, 11, OP, ED), Storyboard Artist (1, 11, OP, ED)
Miyakawa-ke no Kūfuku (2013) 
Senyū (2013): Also Episode Director (ED), Storyboard Artist (1-3), Scriptwriter (5-6, 9, 10)
Wake Up, Girls! – Seven Idols (2014): Also Original Creator, Storyboard Artist
Wake Up, Girls! (2014): Also Original Creator
Wake Up, Girls! The Shadow of Youth (2015): Also Original Creator
Wake Up, Girls! Beyond the Bottom (2015): Also Original Creator
Hakubo (2019): Also Original Creator, Sound Director, and Scriptwriter
Magical Girls (tentative title) Original Creator

Other
 Generator Gawl (1998): Assistant Episode Director (ep 11)
 Jungle wa Itsumo Hale Nochi Guu Final (2001): Episode Director (ep 7, 8), Storyboard (ep 7, 8)Shakugan no Shana Second (2007): Storyboard (OP 2)Sketchbook ~full color'S~ (2007): Episode Director (ep 11)Persona -trinity soul- (2008): Storyboard (ep 6)
 Black Rock Shooter (2010): Supervising Director

References

Sources
Maeda, Hisashi et al. "Lucky☆Star". (May 2007) Newtype USA''. p. 67.

External links

 VALU Yutaka Yamamoto
 Yamamoto Yutaka Jimusho Co ., LTD.

Anime directors
People from Minoh, Osaka
Kyoto University alumni
1974 births
Living people
Kyoto Animation people